Dieciocho Airport  is an agricultural airport serving Finca Dieciocho (Farm 18) and other oil palm plantations in Puntarenas Province, Costa Rica. The runway lies alongside an unpaved field access road.

There are distant hills north of Dieciocho Airport.

See also

 Transport in Costa Rica
 List of airports in Costa Rica

References

External links
 OurAirports - Dieciocho
 OpenStreetMap - Dieciocho
 FallingRain - Dieciocho Airport
 

Airports in Costa Rica
Puntarenas Province